The Naguanagua Botanical Garden, also known as Bachiller José Saer D'Eguert Botanical Garden, is a botanical garden located south of the city of Naguanagua, Carabobo State in the South American country of Venezuela. It has a free area of about 15 hectares, with more than 200 adult trees.

History
Its history begins when a group of people from the community, interested in improving the environmental quality, proposed the idea of creating a protected area to the municipal council that accedes and finally the 2 of April 1991 the mayoralty decides to create the Naguanagua Botanical Garden Foundation. The land for the garden was donated by the Salesian Agronomic Society.

Plants
The vegetation existing in the area of the Botanical Garden consists of three plant formations or associations: Remnant of a semi-deciduous forest (trees lose their leaves during drought), aquatic vegetation associated with a seasonal wetland and a savanna of anthropic origin (created by man) with grasses and scattered trees.

Location
It is located in the North Guaparo behind the Olympic Village of Carabobo to the south of the Municipality Naguanagua in the Carabobo State.

See also
List of national parks of Venezuela
Caracas Botanical Garden

References

Botanical gardens in Venezuela
Protected areas established in 1991
Carabobo